Flavorful Origins (风味原产地) is a Chinese television documentary series, exploring culinary secrets of China and the various cooking techniques and cuisines with native Asian ingredients from the Chaoshan (season 1, 2019), Yunnan (season 2, 2019), Gansu (season 3, 2020), Guiyang (season 4, 2021) regions.  Season 4 of Flavorful Origins premiered on 22 June, 2021 in China.

Netflix release
Season 1 was released on February 11, 2019, on Netflix streaming. Season 2 of Flavorful Origins was released on Netflix on October 30, 2019. Season 3 was released on November 20, 2020.

Episodes

Season 1 - Chaoshan Cuisine 潮汕 (2019)

Season 2 - Yunnan Cuisine 云南 (2019)

Season 3 - Gansu Cuisine 甘肃 (2020)

Season 4 - Guiyang Cuisine 贵阳 (2021)

References

External links
 
 

2010s documentary television series
Chinese documentary television series
Mandarin-language television shows
Chinese cuisine